Uklana Mandi is a city, municipal committee and Uklana (Vidhan Sabha constituency), in Hisar district in the Indian state of Haryana.

Education 
Schools in the region include:
 Golden Public School, Surewala Chowk
 Oxford Public School, Daulatpur Road
 Government College, Uklana
 New C.R. Sr. Sec. School, Uklana
 Jain adshiwer High school (Sanjay Gupta)

External links
http://www.uklana.in – Uklana City Portal

References

Cities and towns in Hisar district